James Hamilton Windrim (January 4, 1840 – April 26, 1919) was a Philadelphia architect who specialized in public buildings, including the Masonic Temple in Philadelphia and the U.S. Treasury.  A number the buildings he designed are on the National Historic Landmarks and/or the National Register of Historic Places, including the Masonic Temple in Philadelphia and the National Savings and Trust Company building in Washington, DC.

Career

Born in Philadelphia, Pennsylvania, he apprenticed under John Notman, and opened his own office in 1867. That same year, at age 27, he won the design competition for the Philadelphia Masonic Temple, the building for which he is best remembered.
 
In 1871, he was named architect for the Stephen Girard Estate, designing several buildings at Girard College and a complex of stores on Market Street that became Snellenburg's Department Store. As Supervising Architect for the U.S. Treasury Department, 1889–91, he was responsible for all federal construction. He designed at least sixteen federal buildings across the country that consolidated post offices, federal offices and federal courts. He returned to his native city, and served as Director of Public Works for the City of Philadelphia, 1891-95.

He served as president of the Philadelphia Chapter of the American Institute of Architects, 1879-86. His son, John T. Windrim, joined his architectural firm in 1882 (James H. Windrim & Son), and took over after the father's retirement. Windrim died in Philadelphia at age 79.

Windrim designed the Smith Memorial Arch in West Fairmount Park, Philadelphia, which features a bronze bust of him by sculptor Samuel Murray.

Selected works

Philadelphia buildings

 Philadelphia Masonic Temple, NE corner Broad & Filbert Streets (1868–73).
 Academy of Natural Sciences, 1900 Logan Square (now Logan Circle) (1868–72).
 Kemble-Bergdoll Mansion, 2201-05 Green Street, (ca. 1885). Windrim added the carriage house in 1889.
 Falls Bridge over Schuylkill River, Fairmount Park (1894–95), with George S. Webster, chief engineer, City of Philadelphia.
 Smith Memorial Playground & Playhouse, Reservoir Drive, East Fairmount Park (1898–99).
 Smith Memorial Arch (Civil War Memorial), South Concourse & Lansdowne Drive, West Fairmount Park (1898–1912), with John T. Windrim.
North American Building, 121 South Broad Street (1900). This was the tallest building in Philadelphia for about a year, until the 1901 completion of City Hall Tower.
 Commonwealth Title & Trust Company Building, 1201-05 Chestnut Street (1901–06), with John T. Windrim.
 Main Building, Thomas Jefferson University Hospital, 132 South 10th Street (1903).
 Lafayette Building, NE corner Fifth & Chestnut Streets (1907–08), with John T. Windrim.

Demolished Philadelphia buildings
 Philadelphia Trust, Safe Deposit and Insurance Company, 415 Chestnut Street (1873–74, demolished 1959).
 Agricultural Hall, Centennial Exposition, West Fairmount Park (1875–76, demolished).
 Snellenberg's Department Store, 1100-42 Market Street (1886–87, remodeled and upper floors demolished 1960s, remainder demolished 2015). Built by the Stephen Girard Estate.
 Western Saving Fund Society, 1000-08 Walnut Street (ca. 1887, demolished 1967).
 Bank of North America, 305-07 Chestnut Street (1893–95, demolished 1972), with John T. Windrim.

Buildings elsewhere
 National Saving And Trust Company, New York Avenue & Fifteenth Street NW, Washington, D.C. (1888).
 U.S. Post Office and Courthouse (now Paul Laxalt State Building), 401 Carson Street, Carson City, Nevada (1888–91), designed by Mifflin E. Bell, completed by Windrim.
 Altoona Masonic Temple, 1111-19 Eleventh Street, Altoona, Pennsylvania (1889–90).
 U.S. Post Office and Courthouse (now Abingdon Police Department), 425 West Main Street, Abingdon, Virginia (1889–90), with Will A. Freret.
 U.S. Post Office and Courthouse (now Lancaster Municipal Building), 120 North Duke Street, Lancaster, Pennsylvania (1889–92).
 U.S. Post Office and Courthouse (now Mississippi River Commission Building), 1400 Walnut Street, Vicksburg, Mississippi (1890–92).
 U.S. Post Office and Courthouse, Scranton, Pennsylvania (1890–94, demolished 1930).
 U.S. Post Office and Courthouse (Detroit Federal Building), Shelby & Fort Streets, Detroit, Michigan (1890–97, demolished 1931).
 U.S. Post Office and Courthouse (now Springfield City Hall), 830 Boonville Avenue, Springfield, Missouri (1891–94), with Willoughby J. Edbrooke.
 U.S. Post Office and Courthouse, Sacramento, California (1891–94, demolished 1966).
 United States Government Building for Columbian Exposition, Jackson Park, Chicago, Illinois, 1893, Ralph, Julian; Chicago and the World’s Fair Harper & Brothers, 1892, New York  p238

References

External links

 
 James H. Windrim from Philadelphia Architects and Buildings.

1840 births
1919 deaths
Architects from Philadelphia
Burials at West Laurel Hill Cemetery
19th-century American architects